Johan Bertil Stålhane (1 July 1902 in Stockholm – 17 October 1992) was a Swedish chemist, technical researcher and writer.

References

1901 births
1992 deaths
Swedish chemists
Swedish male writers
Stockholm University alumni